Hjalmar Heiberg (26 September 1837 – 25 September 1897) was a Norwegian physician and a professor at the University of Oslo.

Biography
He was born in Christiania (now Oslo), Norway. He was the son of physician Christen Heiberg. His father was  professor in surgery and general practitioner at the National Hospital (Rikshospitalet). He received his  cand.med. in 1862. Heiberg was Professor of Pathological Anatomy at the University of Christiania (now University of Oslo) and from 1859 worked was an assistant to  Emanuel Winge (1827–90) at the National Hospital  as a pathologist and bacteriologist researcher.

He received a one-year scholarship and took a study trip to Würzburg and Vienna in 1869-70. In 1870  followed Winge as professor of pathological medicine.  He was also a general practitioner at the National Hospital, and a specialist in forensic medicine. Heiberg  was a proponent for the new theory of bacteria. His research speciality was the subject of inflammation and published several key articles on the field of infection, both on the basis of his own research and as a provider of foreign research.

Personal life
In 1878, Heiberg married Jeanette Sophie Augusta Dahl (1848-1884). They were the parents of artist Jean Heiberg. He was decorated Knight, First Class of the Royal Norwegian Order of St. Olav in 1890 and was awarded an honorary doctorate at Lund University in 1893.

References

1837 births
1897 deaths
Physicians from Oslo
University of Oslo alumni
Academic staff of the University of Oslo
Norwegian anatomists
19th-century Norwegian physicians
Recipients of the St. Olav's Medal
Burials at the Cemetery of Our Saviour